First Moon Township, in Beaver County, Pennsylvania, existed from 1800 to 1812.

History
First Moon Township was apparently created from Moon Township, Allegheny County at the creation of Beaver County in 1800. Until 1789 all that area south of the Ohio River that would become part of Beaver County was part of Washington County.

In 1789 by an act of the legislature all that portion of Washington County south of the Ohio River that in 1800 was included in First and Second Moon Townships was transferred to Allegheny County. There is no map of Allegheny County of that period showing townships, and there is a break in the Minutes of the Court of Quarter Sessions from 1793 to 1820, two books having been lost or burned at the time of the burning of the Allegheny County court-house, May 7, 1882. But from what is yet remaining of those minutes, that is, up to 1793, and from the Road Dockets and Miscellaneous Dockets, it would appear that this annexed territory was considered a part of one of the original Allegheny County townships, namely Moon. The dockets uniformly show under the head of Moon township the petitions for roads, etc., coming up from the inhabitants in every part of the annexed region. 

This is the case up to 1800, when Beaver County was formed; and until 1804, when Beaver County ceased to be connected with Allegheny County for judicial purposes. All that part of the county, even as far down as Georgetown, is spoken of as Moon township.

First Moon Township was one of three original townships south of the Ohio River in Beaver County at Beaver County's creation on 12 March 1800. First Moon Township became extinct when the area in Beaver County south of the Ohio River was reorganized into four townships in 1812. 

Former townships in Pennsylvania
1800 establishments in Pennsylvania
1810s disestablishments in Pennsylvania
Townships in Beaver County, Pennsylvania

References